= Argyle Heights, Virginia =

Unincorporated community in Virginia, US

Coordinates: 38°17′13″N 77°25′56″W

Argyle Heights is an unincorporated community residential neighborhood in Stafford County, in the U.S. state of Virginia.
